Shirur Tajband is a major village in Ahmadpur taluka of Latur district in Indian state of Maharashtra. As per 2011 census, village had population of 10,577 with literacy rate of 805 and average sex ratio of 938. Village is 10 km away from taluka headquarter Ahmadpur and 56 km away from district headquarter Latur.

References

Villages in Latur district
Villages_in_Ahmedpur_taluka